AEK Men's Water Polo Club is the men's water polo department of the major Greek multi-sport club, AEK Sports Club, based in Athens, Greece. The club's home ground is in Athens. It was founded in 1962 and after its dissolution in the '70s, it was re-established in 2017.

History
The waterpolo department of AEK was first founded in 1962 and maintained until the early 1970s. During its first season, they won two Third Division Championships. In 1963, AEK was fourth in the Third Division Championship, in the same position in 1964, third in 1965 and champion in 1966, to compete the following year 1967 in the Second Division where they finished sixth and relegated.

Champion again in 1968 in the Third Division, they did not play in the 1969 championship of the A2 Greek Water Polo League and so, somewhere there, the thread of that team is lost. The department was re-established in 2017. The decision to re-establish the department by the Board of AEK Sports Club was received on March 23, 2017, after the proposal made by Panos Michalopoulos and Giorgos Kirmizoglou, something that was officially announced after a while.

On 6 July 2020, the club promoted to the Greek Water Polo League for the first time in their history.

Honours
 A2 Greek Men's Water Polo League
 Winners (1): 2020
 A3 Greek Men's Water Polo League
 Winners (3): 1966, 1968, 2018

Current squad
Season 2022–23

Staff

See also
AEK Women's Water Polo Club

Sponsorships
Great Sponsor: Molto

References

External links
 

Water polo clubs in Greece
Sports clubs in Athens
Sports clubs established in 2017
2017 establishments in Greece